Christ Church, Cockfosters, is a conservative evangelical Anglican church in Chalk Lane, in the north London suburb of Cockfosters. It is about 200m from Cockfosters Underground station.

History
The church was founded by Robert Cooper Lee Bevan, a member of the family who also founded Barclays Bank, and the funerary monument to the Bevan family is the largest single monument in the graveyard at Christ Church. The church was designed by Henry Edward Kendall, and consecrated by Bishop Blomfield on 9 April 1839.

In 1898, the church was renovated and redesigned by Sir Arthur Blomfield. Tubular bells were later installed as part of a monument to former pupils of Heddon Court School who died during the First World War.

St Paul's Church, Hadley Wood, opened in 1911, initially as an offshoot of Christ Church, but became independent in 2000.

Gallery

References

External links 

Cockfosters
Diocese of London
19th-century Church of England church buildings
Cockfosters
Bevan family
Conservative evangelical Anglican churches in England